Bride of Firesign is a comedy album by the Firesign Theatre released in 2001 by Rhino Records. It is the third volume of the Firesign's Millenium Trilogy We're Doomed, following Give Me Immortality or Give Me Death (1998) and Boom Dot Bust (1999).

Track listing

References

External links
Homepage

2001 albums
The Firesign Theatre albums
Rhino Records albums
1990s comedy albums